Natsudaidain is an O-methylated flavonol, a type of chemical compound. It can be isolated from Citrus plants (Rutaceae). The name of the molecule comes from Citrus natsudaidai (Natsumikan, lit. "summer tangerine"), a fruit of Japan developed in 1740 with a particularly tart/sour taste.

References 

O-methylated flavonols
Flavonoids found in Rutaceae